Ernest Charles Auguste Candèze  was a Belgian doctor and entomologist who was born 22 February 1827 at Liège and died in Glain, 30 June 1898.
He studied in Liège under Jean Theodore Lacordaire (1801–1870), then studied medicine in Paris and Liège. Following Lacordaire's advice he joined the circle of entomologists in Liège which included his longtime friend Félicien Chapuis (1824–1879) as well as Edmond de Sélys Longchamps (1813–1900) and the English entomologist Robert McLachlan (1837–1904). He took part in the foundation of the Belgian Entomological Society.
Lacordaire encouraged him to specialize in Elateridae on which he published revisions of which the very rare Monographie of Elateridae (four volumes, Liège, 1857–1863) is important. He was a friend of the French editor Pierre-Jules Hetzel (1814–1886) who pressed him to write scientific novels in order to popularize entomology to a larger audience: Aventures d'un grillon, Adventures of a cricket (Paris, 1877), La Gileppe, les infortunes d'une population d'insectes, Gileppe, misfortunes of a population of insects (Paris, 1879), which had a certain success, and Périnette, histoire surprenante de cinq moineaux... Périnette, surprising history of five sparrows... (Paris, 1886). Also impassioned by photography, he developed a foldable camera which was a great success in Europe (and which was accompanied by his book Le Scénographe, appareil photographique de poche..., Paris, 1875)

References
 Translated from the French Wikipedia

External links
BHL Monographie of Elateridae
L'Historique de l'Association Belge de Photographie et de Cinematographie

1827 births
1898 deaths
Scientists from Liège
Belgian entomologists
Physicians from Liège
Members of the Royal Academy of Belgium